Donavan Brazier (born April 15, 1997) is an American middle-distance runner. He holds the American junior record and American record in men's 800 meters and won the gold medal at the 2019 World Championships.

Athletics career

Youth
In 2014, his junior year at Kenowa Hills High School, Brazier won the 800 meters at the New Balance national scholastic championships in 1:48.61; his time was a new Michigan state record. His times continued the drop in his senior year; he ran a 45.92 split on a 4 × 400 meters relay and improved his 800-meter best to 1:47.55, placing him fourth on the all-time national high school list. Brazier ran 1:47.55 in June 2015 at 800 meters at Seattle Brooks PR. Brazier competed in the 800 meters at 2015 USA Junior Outdoor Track and Field Championships but was disqualified. In summer 2015, Brazier attempted to earn an opportunity to represent United States on his first national team as a junior (U20) at 2015 Pan American Junior Athletics Championships to compete in the 800 m.

Collegiate
After graduating from high school after the 2015 season Brazier went to Texas A&M University, where he was coached by former top runner Alleyne Francique and head coach Pat Henry. He ran 1:45.92 in his collegiate debut race on January 16, 2016, breaking John Marshall's American junior indoor record by almost two seconds; the time was also a NACAC junior indoor record, and missed the American collegiate record by only 0.05 seconds. He won the 2016 SEC indoor championship in 1:46.08, but failed to finish his heat at the NCAA indoor championships due to a back injury.

Brazier returned to action outdoors, but needed several meets to return to top shape. He placed third at the SEC outdoor championships in 1:46.19, half a second behind Mississippi State's Brandon McBride. At the NCAA outdoor championships in Eugene Brazier won his semi-final in a personal best 1:45.07. The final was a rematch between Brazier and McBride; McBride led for most of the way, but Brazier passed him with 150 meters to go and won in 1:43.55. The time was a new collegiate record, American Junior and NACAC junior record and world junior (U20) leader; the previous American junior outdoor record was Jim Ryun's 1:44.3/1:44.9, set exactly fifty years earlier on June 10, 1966.

Professional
Brazier turned professional after his NCAA victory, signing an endorsement deal with Nike and forgoing his three remaining years of collegiate eligibility. Brazier finished 19th in 800 meters at 2016 USATF Olympic Trials in 1:48.13. Donavan Brazier reconnected with his coach from Texas A&M University (Grenada’s top 400 m runner Alleyne Francique). At the 2017 National Championships, he followed Eric Sowinski's early kick into a breakaway position and held his pace as Sowinski faded to win his first National Championship, thus qualifying for the World Championships.

On August 29, 2019, Brazier set a new 800 meter personal best of 1:42.70 en route to winning the Diamond League meet in Zurich, Switzerland. In this race, Brazier demonstrated phenomenal finishing speed by overtaking Botswanan runner Nijel Amos in the last 30 meters, who had attempted the race at world record pace.

On October 1, 2019, Brazier won the 800 meter at the World Championships in Doha, Qatar. His time of 1:42.34 was a championships record and a new American record, surpassing Johnny Gray's 1:42.60 from 1985.  At the end of the season, Brazier was selected for the Jesse Owens Award.

On February 8, 2020, Brazier set the American indoor 800 meter record in a time of 1:44.22. He opened his 2020 season, in a 1500 meters 2020 world lead of 3:35.85. In August he ran another 2020 world lead in the 800 meters of 1:43.15.

On February 13, 2021, Brazier ran 1:44.21 in the 800m at the New Balance Indoor Grand Prix in New York City to lower his own American indoor record in the event by .01.

Personal Bests

Personal life

Notes

References

External links

 
 
 
 Donavan Brazier – Kenowa Hills High School at DyeStat.com
 

1997 births
Living people
American male middle-distance runners
Sportspeople from Grand Rapids, Michigan
Texas A&M Aggies men's track and field athletes
Track and field athletes from Michigan
United States collegiate record holders in athletics (track and field)
World Athletics Championships athletes for the United States
World Athletics Championships medalists
World Athletics Championships winners
Diamond League winners
USA Outdoor Track and Field Championships winners
USA Indoor Track and Field Championships winners